The Canadian River is the largest tributary of the Arkansas River in the United States. 

Canadian River may also refer to:

 Canadian River (Colorado), a tributary of the North Platte River in Jackson County, Colorado
 North Canadian River, a tributary of the Canadian River in Oklahoma

See also
 List of rivers of Canada